The Big Brunch is an American cooking competition television series hosted by Dan Levy for HBO Max.

Levy serves as judge along with Sohla El-Waylly and Will Guidara. Executive producers are Levy, Andrew Fried, Sarina Roma, Dane Lillegard and Faye Stapleton of Boardwalk Pictures.

Premise
The series' eight-episode first season pits 10 chefs against each other for a cash prize of $300,000.

Cast
 Dan Levy - Host and Judge
 Sohla El-Waylly - Judge
 Will Guidara - Judge

Episodes

References

External links
 

HBO Max original programming
2022 American television series debuts
Reality competition television series
Food reality television series
Cooking competitions in the United States
2020s American cooking television series
2020s American reality television series
Television series by Boardwalk Pictures